Pete Peeters (born August 17, 1957) is a Canadian former professional ice hockey goaltender. He was selected by the Philadelphia Flyers in the eighth round (135th overall) of the 1977 NHL amateur draft. and went on to play 13 seasons in the National Hockey League (NHL) for the Philadelphia Flyers, Boston Bruins and Washington Capitals. He featured in the 1980 Stanley Cup Finals with the Flyers and won the 1984 Canada Cup with Team Canada.

Early life
Peeters was born in a family of Dutch immigrants in Edmonton, Alberta. At a young age, he valued swimming more than hockey. It was not until he was 18 that Peeters was committed to junior hockey. In 1975, Peeters joined a struggling Medicine Hat Tigers team. He would stay with the Tigers for two years before being drafted. Peeters was drafted 135th overall by the Philadelphia Flyers in the 1977 NHL amateur draft after showing scouts that he had what it took to play at an NHL level. He played for two years in the AHL winning the Harry "Hap" Holmes Memorial Award for best GAA in the league, won back-to-back Calder Cups, and he was also selected to the first All-Star team.

Playing career

Philadelphia Flyers
Peeters was called up by the Flyers in 1980 sharing the net with Phil Myre. Peeters started with a 22–0–5 record before losing his first game of the season on February 19. The Flyers went a NHL record 35 straight games without a loss that season. Peeters finished the season with a 29–5–5 record with a 2.73 GAA. He led the Flyers all the way to the Stanley Cup Finals before losing to the New York Islanders on an overtime goal by Bob Nystrom. For his effort, Peeters was selected to play in the NHL All-Star Game.

The following season, expectations were high for Peeters, but he did not meet them. Over the next two years his GAA rose and his playoff success diminished. In 1982, he was traded to the Boston Bruins for defenceman Brad McCrimmon.

Boston Bruins
Peeters joined the Boston Bruins for the 1982–83 season. Peeters had perhaps his best year as he played in 62 games and posting a 40–11–9 record with 8 shutouts and a decade-best 2.36 GAA. At one point, Peeters went 31 games without a loss. He won the Vezina Trophy for his spectacular play and was selected First All-Star team goalie. He also played in the All-Star Game in his first season with Boston. Surprisingly, Peeters finished 2nd in voting for the Hart Memorial Trophy to Wayne Gretzky. Next season, expectations were high again for Peeters and, like in Philadelphia, he did not meet them. He played for two more years with the Bruins with his GAA inflating and the losses piling up.

1984 Canada Cup
Peeters was invited to Team Canada for the 1984 Canada Cup. Despite having a sprained ankle, Peeters was able to play in four tournament games including both best-of-three final games against Sweden and the memorable overtime win against the Soviets in the semifinal.

Washington Capitals
After the Canada Cup experience, Peeters had trouble readjusting his game to the NHL level. After a slow start in the 1985–86 season, Peeters was traded to the Washington Capitals in exchange for goaltender Pat Riggin. Peeters had much success with the Caps by providing a solid goaltending for the next four seasons and became the team’s starting goalie in the playoffs. However, his team never advanced past the second round.

Return to Philadelphia
Peeters returned to Philadelphia in 1990 by way of free agency. He remained there for the last two seasons of his career sharing the net with Ron Hextall and Ken Wregget. Peeters would hang up the pads in 1991.

Coaching
At the end of his playing career, Peeters returned to the family farm in Edmonton. He then got into coaching, serving as a goaltender coach to the Minnesota North Stars, Winnipeg Jets, Phoenix Coyotes, and the Edmonton Oilers. From July 2009 to June 2013 he was the goaltending coach for the Anaheim Ducks, a position which had been left vacant following the departure of François Allaire.

Family
Peeters' son Trevor (born July 2, 1987) played 36 games over four seasons (2003 – 2007) as a goaltender in the Western Hockey League for the Red Deer Rebels, Swift Current Broncos, and Saskatoon Blades.

Awards/Records and Achievements
 Selected to the AHL second All-Star team in 1979.
 Harry "Hap" Holmes Memorial Award in 1979 (shared with Robbie Moore).
 Selected to the NHL first All-Star team in 1983.
 Vezina Trophy winner in 1983.
 Played in 1980, 1981, 1983, and 1984 NHL All-Star Games.
 Canada Cup winner in 1984.
 Only goalie in NHL history to have two (25+) game unbeaten streaks.
 Only goalie in NHL history to have two (25+) game unbeaten streaks playing on two different teams.
 One of two goalies to have a (30+) game unbeaten streak along with Gerry Cheevers.
 While fishing in British Columbia, Caught the largest sturgeon fish ever recorded at 11-feet six-inches long, boasted 55 inches of girth, and weighed an incredible 890 pounds.

Career statistics

Regular season and playoffs

International

References

External links
 
 Pete Peeters biography at The Goaltender Home Page - advanced statistics, pre-1982 save percentages, and game logs
Pete Peeters profile at Hockey Draft Central
Profile at Greatest Hockey Legends

1957 births
Living people
Anaheim Ducks coaches
Arizona Coyotes coaches
Binghamton Whalers players
Boston Bruins players
Canadian ice hockey goaltenders
Canadian people of Dutch descent
Edmonton Oilers coaches
Hershey Bears players
Maine Mariners players
Medicine Hat Tigers players
Milwaukee Admirals (IHL) players
Minnesota North Stars coaches
National Hockey League All-Stars
Philadelphia Flyers draft picks
Philadelphia Flyers players
Ice hockey people from Edmonton
Vezina Trophy winners
Washington Capitals players
Winnipeg Jets (1972–1996) coaches
Canadian ice hockey coaches